Sedjefakare Kay Amenemhat VII was an Egyptian pharaoh of the 13th Dynasty.

Attestations 
He is known from the Turin King List, and several other objects, including six cylinder seals, one bark stand from Medamud and two scarab seals. His name appears as graffito in the tomb of queen Khuit I at Saqqara.

Theories 
Ryholt assigns him without further evidence a reign of 6–7 years.

Bibliography
 K.S.B. Ryholt, The Political Situation in Egypt during the Second Intermediate Period (Carsten Niebuhr Institute Publications, vol. 20. Copenhagen: Museum Tusculanum Press, 1997), 341, File 13/20.

See also 
List of Pharaohs

References 

18th-century BC Pharaohs
Pharaohs of the Thirteenth Dynasty of Egypt